Scooter is a nickname of:

 Scooter Berry (born 1986), professional American football player
 Scooter Braun or Brown (born 1981), American talent manager, businessman, and promoter
 Lloyd L. Burke (1924–1999), U.S. Army soldier awarded the Medal of Honor
 Scooter Gennett (born 1990), American baseball player
 Scooter Libby (born 1950), former adviser to U.S. Vice President Dick Cheney
 Scooter Magruder (born 1988), American YouTube personality, actor, comedian, and new media consultant
 Scooter McCray (born 1960), American professional basketball player
 Ray McLean (1915–1964), American football player and coach
 Scooter Molander (born 1966), American football player
 Phil Rizzuto (1917–2007), American Hall-of-Fame Major League Baseball shortstop and sports announcer
 Eddie Tucker (born 1966), American former Major League Baseball catcher
 Scooter Ward (born 1970), American musician, lead singer of the rock band Cold

Lists of people by nickname